NCSI may refer to:

 National Centre for Science Information (NCSI), the information centre of Indian Institute of Science in Bangalore, India
 NCSI (Network Connectivity Status Indicator), an internet connection awareness protocol used in Microsoft's Windows operating systems
 NC-SI (Network Controller Sideband Interface), an electrical interface and protocol